The 2021 Gagauzian legislative elections were held on 19 September 2021 in order to elect the 35 members of the People's Assembly of Gagauzia in Moldova. The second round or rerun for any applicable constituencies was held on 3 October.

Electoral system
All residents of the Gagauzia who are 21 years or over and are a Moldovan citizen are eligible to vote. The 35 seats are elected from single-member constituencies using the two-round system. If no candidate receives 50% of the vote in the first round, a second round is held between the top two candidates. More than one-third of registered voters must participate in order for the election to be considered valid. If the threshold is not met, the elections will be declared null and void, and will be repeated at a later date.

Results

Summary output

First round

First round rerun 
A rerun was conducted for any election in the first round where turnout did not meet the required threshold for validation. There is no validation threshold for a rerun to be considered valid.

Second round

References

External links
Elections in Gagauzia. eDemocracy.

Gagauzian legislative
September 2021 events in Moldova
2021 legislative